Someone Like You is a 2015 Taiwanese romantic-comedy melodrama television series produced by Sanlih E-Television, starring Kingone Wang and Lorene Ren with Sean Lee, Nita Lei and William Liao of Lollipop F. The original title literally translates to "Hearing Happiness". Filming began on December 21, 2014 and finished on May 19, 2015. The drama was filmed as it aired. First original broadcast began January 11, 2015 on TTV channel airing on Sunday nights from 10:00-11:30 pm. Final episode aired on May 24, 2015 with 20 episodes total.

Synopsis
A man loses everything in one day in a tragic car accident. Fang Zhan Cheng (Kingone Wang) lost his fiancée, Liang Luo Han (Lorene Ren), as well as his eyesight. Devastated by the loss of his fiancée, Zhan Cheng is inconsolable and even refuses a corneal transplant that could restore his vision. But his life takes an unexpected turn when Chen Yu Xi (Lorene Ren), who looks exactly like his fiancée, is hired to become Zhan Cheng’s day nurse. Another young woman, Xu Ya Ti (Nita Lei), receives Luo Han’s heart in a transplant and begins to exhibit many of Luo Han’s mannerisms and personality. Caught between a woman who looks exactly like his beloved dead fiancée and another woman who behaves just like her, what will Zhan Cheng do?.

Cast

Main cast
Kingone Wang as Fang Zhan-cheng 
Lorene Ren as Liang Luo-han / Chen Yu-xi 
Sean Lee as Li Bo-yan 
Nita Lei as Xu Ya-ti 
William Liao as Shen Wei-lian

Supporting cast
Miao Ke-li as Wang Yu-zhen 
Angela Li as Wang Xiao-lin 
Xu Hao-xuan as Chen Yu-an 
Katie Chen as Xie Fei-fei 
Yin Fu as Vanessa
Hu Pei-lian as Yang Yi Min 
Alex Dong 董至成 as Xie Qian-jing 
Lin Xiu-jun as Gao Dong 
Shen Hairong as Juan Jie

Extended cast
Bii as Gu Long 
Fu Lei as Gu Dong chairman 
Jane Tu as Cindy
KaiLi as Reporter 
Ying Wei-min as Triad boss 
THE CLIPPERS BAND as Triad gangsters 
Chen Jun-an as Reporter Chen 
 as Xu Fu

Soundtrack

Someone Like You Original TV Soundtrack (OST) (聽見幸福 電視原聲帶) was released on January 23, 2015 by various artists under Seed Music Co.,Ltd. It contains 21 tracks total, in which 16 songs are various versions of the original songs. The opening theme "I'm Still Missing You 我还想念你" by Bii 畢書盡 is not featured on the official soundtrack CD since singer Bii is signed exclusively to Linfair Records. The closing theme is track 1 "Empty 空" by Tracy Wang 汪小敏.

Track listing

Songs not featured on the official soundtrack album.
I'm Still Missing You 我还想念你 by Bii 畢書盡
Baby Don't 你在ㄍㄧㄥ什麼? by Bii 畢書盡
My Love For You Will Not Change 我愛你不會改變 by Bii 畢書盡
We Are Walking in Love 我們在愛中漫步 by Bii 畢書盡
Break Me Down by Bii 畢書盡

Publications

* 15 April 2015 : Someone Like You Original Novel (聽見幸福 原創小說) -  - Author: Sanlih E-Television 三立電視監製, Fang Xiao-ren 方孝仁, Chen Bi-zhen 陳碧真 - Publisher: Taiwan Kadokawa 台灣角川 
A novel based on the drama was published detailing the entire story line of the drama. Spoilers were revealed in the novel before the drama finished airing. 
* 2 April 2015 : S-Pop Vol. 26 April 2015 (華流 4月號/2015第26期) - Author: Sanlih E-Television 三立電視監製 
For the April 2015 issue of S-Pop magazine, lead actors Kingone Wang and Lorene Ren appear on the cover of the regular edition of the April 2015 issue.
* 3 May 2015 : S-Pop Vol. 27 May 2015 (華流 5月號/2015第27期) - Author: Sanlih E-Television 三立電視監製 
A special issue of May 2015 S-Pop volume 27 was devoted to the drama Someone Like You. Two editions of the same cover featuring Kingone Wang and Lorene Ren was published. The regular edition with the magazine itself only and a special edition with one of two random mini die cut cardboard cutout of the lead actors included.

Development and casting
The main male and female lead, Kingone Wang and Lorene Ren were introduced to the press at a press conference held at SETTV headquarters rooftop garden lobby in Neihu District, Taipei on December 19, 2014. 
The premier press conference was held on January 9, 2015 at TTV headquarters in Songshan District, Taipei. The extended cast was unveiled and an extended 16 minute trailer was previewed. Fans were also invited via first-come, first-served seating to meet the cast.
On January 16, 2015, another entire main cast press conference was held at SETTV headquarters auditorium in Neihu District, Taipei for the drama premier on SETTV channel. Fans were also invited to the event via first-come, first-served seating to meet the cast.
A farewell fan meet and greet event was held on May 23, 2015 to thank fans for making the drama a success. The event was held at SETTV headquarters main auditorium in Neihu District, Taipei.
The wrap up celebration party was held on May 27, 2015.

Episode ratings

International Broadcast

Awards and nominations

References

External links
Someone Like You TTV Website  
Someone Like You SETTV Official website 
Someone Like You Official Facebook page 

2015 Taiwanese television series debuts
2015 Taiwanese television series endings
Sanlih E-Television original programming
Taiwanese romance television series